Elections to Strathclyde Regional Council were held on Thursday 6 May 1982, on the same day as the eight other Scottish regional elections. This was the third election to the regional council following the local government reforms in the 1970s.

The election was the first to use the 103 electoral divisions created by the Initial Reviews of Electoral Arrangements in 1978. Each electoral division elected one councillor using first-past-the-post voting.

Labour, who had won every previous election to Strathclyde Regional Council, retained a large majority by winning 79 of the 103 seats – up seven from the previous election in 1978. The Conservatives remained as the second largest party despite their vote share falling by 7.5%. The party won 15 seats, 10 fewer than in the previous election. The Liberal Party doubled their representation on the regional council after winning four seats. Despite coming third in the popular vote, the Scottish National Party (SNP) were the fourth-largest party on the regional council after they gained only one seat to hold three. The remaining two seats were won by independent candidates.

The Liberal Party and the Social Democratic Party (SDP) contested this election political alliance in which only one of the two parties would stand a candidate in any given seat.

The Conservative group leader, Leonard Turpie, lost his seat to the SDP-Liberal Alliance. They also lost the adjoining seat to Labour. Both seats were contained within the Glasgow Hillhead constituency won in March by SDP figure Roy Jenkins.

Following the election, there was an attempt to unseat the incumbent leader of Strathclyde Regional Council Dick Stewart, who had held the position since the council's creation. He was challenged for the leadership by his longtime friend and colleague Charles Gray at the first meeting of the Labour group following the election. The attempt however failed, with Stewart retaining the leadership with 40 votes to Gray's 38.

Results

Source:

Electoral division results

Argyll and Bute

Dumbarton

Glasgow

Kilmarnock North

Kilmarnock South

Stewarton and Irvine Valley

Cumnock

New Cumnock and Doon Valley

References

Strathclyde
1982
May 1982 events in the United Kingdom